Jay Finley (born May 15, 1988) is a former American football running back. He was drafted by the Cincinnati Bengals in the seventh round of the 2011 NFL Draft. He played college football at Baylor.

College career
Finley played his college career for the Baylor University Bears in Waco, Texas.  Finley started his career at Baylor sporting the number 32 but finished wearing 23, the number he wore during his early career.  Finley graduated in May with a degree in general studies.

Freshman year 
Finley finished off his freshman year with 55 attempts for 207 yards, 3.8 yards per carry, with two rushing touchdowns.  On top of that he added 18 receptions for 152 yards and another score.

Sophomore year 
Finley finished his sophomore year with 149 carries for 865 yards, 5.8 yards per carry and seven rushing touchdowns.  He added seven receptions for 141 (20.1 yards per catch) and two more touchdowns.

Junior year 
Although Finley started his third year atop the depth chart at running back, he struggled battling an ankle injury throughout the season.  It hampered his production, carrying the ball 79 times for 370 yards, dropping his per carry average to 4.7.  His receptions didn't drop much as he had six for 47 yards.  He had one touchdown on the season (rushing).

Senior year 
Finley finally secured his breakout season in his final year of eligibility rushing for 1,218 yards on 195 carries, an impressive 6.2 yards per carry.  That is behind only Terrance Ganaway's 1,347 yards for the team's single season record.  While the number of receptions Finley had increased to nine, he only had 76 yards.  The 12 touchdowns Finley accumulated during the season all came on the ground.  He averaged 93.69 yards per game.

Career stats and records 
Finley's career at Baylor ended with him first in single season rushing yards, single game rushing yards at 250, third in career rushing yards at 2,660, and fourth in career touchdowns at 22.

Pro day workout numbers 
39.5 inch vertical
11 foot broad jump
550 pound squat
14 bench reps at 225 pounds
4.51 forty yard dash
4.36 twenty yard shuttle

Professional career
Finley was drafted with the Cincinnati Bengals' seventh round pick, number 248. Cincinnati.com reported the Bengals had signed running back Jay Finley to a rookie contract on July 30. He was waived on September 3.  He was signed to the Seahawks' practice squad on December 6, 2011.

References

External links
 Cincinnati Bengals bio
 Baylor Bears bio

1988 births
Living people
American football running backs
Baylor Bears football players
Cincinnati Bengals players
Seattle Seahawks players
Tri-Cities Fever players
People from Corsicana, Texas
Players of American football from Texas